Onaje Allan Gumbs (born Allan Bentley Gumbs, September 3, 1949 – April 6, 2020) was a New York-based pianist, composer, and bandleader.

Early life and career
Gumbs was born in Harlem, a neighborhood in New York City, to parents who had immigrated to the United States from the Caribbean. Gumbs' mother was from Montserrat, while his father, a New York City police officer, was from Anguilla). He was the nephew of Hubert Harrison's daughter-in-law. As a child, Gumbs was fascinated by the film and television music of Henry Mancini. Gumbs graduated from the State University of New York at Fredonia, and during his years there was a member of a student-organized jazz ensemble.

In 1971, Leroy Kirkland introduced Gumbs to the Detroit guitarist Kenny Burrell, to whom Onaje gave a demo tape.  The following day, Gumbs received a call to play with Burrell at Baker's Keyboard Lounge in Detroit.  This work led to further performances with major jazz musicians such as bassist Larry Ridley as well as The Thad Jones/ Mel Lewis Orchestra. During the early 1970s, Gumbs replaced Nat Adderley, Jr. in a contemporary jazz ensemble called Natural Essence, which included during these years Buddy Williams and T. S. Monk (drums and percussion), bassist Alex Blake, and trombonist Earl McIntyre.

Gumbs adopted the name Onaje in the early 1970s; it means "the sensitive one". He met his future wife, Sandra Wright, in 1971 during a short teaching engagement he took in Buffalo, New York. The two wed later in the decade and remained married until Gumbs' death in 2020.

In the late 1970s, Gumbs recorded with Woody Shaw and worked as musical director for R&B singer Phyllis Hyman, Angela Bofill and Jeffrey Osborne. Later in his career he worked extensively with Ronald Shannon Jackson, and in 2013, following Jackson's death, Gumbs recorded a solo piano album consisting of improvisations on Jackson's compositions. Later in his life, he taught at the New School for Jazz and Contemporary Music in Manhattan and the Litchfield Jazz Camp in Connecticut.

"His association with the New School for Jazz and Contemporary Music in New York and his work with the Litchfield Jazz Camp in New Milford, Conn., allowed him to expand his vision and shape young minds."

Later life
On January 24, 2010, Gumbs suffered a stroke and was hospitalized for two days. In December of that year, he released an album in Japan entitled Just Like Yesterday. On the album, he was accompanied by Omar Hakim, Victor Bailey, Marcus McLaurine, William S. Patterson and Chuggy Carter. Any visible signs of the stroke had since vanished.

In February 2015, he was hospitalized for two weeks, though he was able to recover and return to composing and performance.

Onaje Allan Gumbs died on April 6, 2020, aged 70.

Discography

As leader

Main source:

As sideman
With Nat Adderley
Don't Look Back (SteepleChase, 1976)
Hummin' (Little David, 1976)
With T. K. Blue
Follow the North Star (JaJa, 2008)
With Betty Carter
The Betty Carter Album (Bet-Car Productions, 1976)
With Norman Connors
Dark of Light
Love from the Sun
Saturday Night Special
You Are My Starship
Invitation
Mr. C
Eternity
With Carlos Garnett
Black Love (Muse, 1974)
With Toninho Horta
Moonstone (Verve Forecast, 1989)
Foot On The Road (Verve, 1994)With Ronald Shannon Jackson 
Decode Yourself (Island, 1985)With Bennie MaupinSlow Traffic to the Right
MoonscapesWith Cecil McBeeMutima (Strata-East, 1974)With Mark MosleyTLC (Mark Mosley, 2012)With Avery SharpeRunning Man (JKNM, 2011)
Sojourner Truth: Ain't I a Woman (JKNM, 2013)With Woody ShawThe Moontrane (Muse, 1974)
Rosewood (Columbia, 1977)
Stepping Stones: Live at the Village Vanguard (Columbia, 1978)
Woody III (Columbia, 1979)With John StubblefieldPrelude (Storyville, 1978)With Charles SullivanGenesis (Strata-East, 1974)With Lenny White
Venusian Summer
Big City

References

External links
 

1949 births
2020 deaths
Jazz fusion pianists
Post-bop pianists
Hard bop pianists
Jazz-funk pianists
Modal jazz pianists
American jazz composers
American male jazz composers
American jazz pianists
American male pianists
20th-century classical composers
Songwriters from New York (state)
American funk musicians
SteepleChase Records artists
Musicians from Queens, New York
20th-century American composers
20th-century American pianists
Jazz musicians from New York (state)
21st-century American pianists
20th-century American male musicians
21st-century American male musicians
American people of Montserratian descent
American people of Anguillan descent
20th-century jazz composers
American male songwriters